Back to the Bus can refer to two compilation albums:
Back to the Bus (Babyshambles album), released in 2006
Back to the Bus (Funeral for a Friend album), released in 2007